Provençal (or  ) is a variety of Occitan, spoken by people in Provence and parts of Drôme and Gard. Historically, the term Provençal has been used to refer to the whole of the Occitan language, but today it is considered more technically appropriate to refer only to the variety of Occitan spoken in Provence. However it can still be found  being used to refer to Occitan as a whole, e.g. Merriam-Webster states that it can be used to refer to general Occitan, though this is going out of use.

Thus the ISO 639-3 code for Old Occitan is [pro].

In 2007, all the ISO 639-3 codes for Occitan dialects, including [prv] for Provençal, were retired and merged into [oci] Occitan. The old codes ([prv], [auv], [gsc], [lms], [lnc]) are no longer in active use, but still have the meaning assigned them when they were established in the Standard.

Subdialects
The main subdialects of Provençal are:
 Rodanenc (in French Rhodanien) around the lower Rhone river, Arles, Avignon, Nîmes.
 A Rodanenc subvariety, the Shuadit (or Judeo-Provençal), has been considered extinct since 1977. It was spoken by the Jewish community around Avignon. When Jews were granted freedom of residence in France the dialect declined.
 Maritim or Centrau or Mediterranèu (Maritime or Central or Mediterranean) around Aix-en-Provence, Marseille, Toulon, Cannes, Antibes, Grasse, Forcalquier, Castellane, Draguignan.
 Niçard in the lower County of Nice.

Gavòt (in French Gavot), spoken in the Western Occitan Alps, around Digne, Sisteron, Gap, Barcelonnette and the upper County of Nice, but also in a part of the Ardèche, is not exactly a subdialect of Provençal, but rather a closely related Occitan dialect, also known as Vivaro-Alpine. So is the dialect spoken in the upper valleys of Piedmont, Italy (Val Maira, Val Varaita, Val Stura di Demonte, Entracque, Limone Piemonte, Vinadio, Sestriere). Some people view Gavòt as a variety of Provençal since a part of the Gavot area (near Digne and Sisteron) belongs to historical Provence.

Orthography
Nouns and adjectives usually drop the Latin masculine endings, but -e remains; the feminine ending is -o (this is the opposite of the neighbouring Italian masculine gender). Nouns do not inflect for number, but all adjectives ending in vowels (-e or -o) become -i, and all plural adjectives take -s before vowels.

When written in the classical norm (""), definite articles are masculine  [lu], feminine  [la], and plural  [lej/lejz = li/liz]. Nouns and adjectives usually drop the Latin masculine endings, but -e [e] remains; the feminine ending is -a [ɔ]. Nouns inflect for number, all adjectives ending in vowels (-e or -a) become -ei/-eis [ej/ejz = i/iz] in some syntactic positions, and most plural adjectives take -s.

Pronunciation remains the same in both norms (Mistralian and classical), which are only two different ways to write the same language.

Literature
Modern Provençal literature was given impetus by Nobel laureate Frédéric Mistral and the association Félibrige he founded with other writers, such as Théodore Aubanel. The beginning of the 20th century saw other authors like Joseph d'Arbaud, Batisto Bonnet and Valère Bernard. It has been enhanced and modernized since the second half of the 20th century by writers such as Robèrt Lafont, Pierre Pessemesse, Claude Barsotti, Bernat Giély, and many others.

See also
 Occitan conjugation
 Languages of France

Notes

References
 Jules (Jùli) Ronjat, L’ourtougràfi prouvençalo, Avignon: Vivo Prouvènço!, 1908.
 Robert Lafont, Phonétique et graphie du provençal: essai d’adaptation de la réforme linguistique occitane aux parlers de Provence, Toulouse: Institut d’Études Occitanes, 1951 [2nd ed. 1960] 
 Robèrt Lafont, L’ortografia occitana, lo provençau, Montpellier: Universitat de Montpelhièr III-Centre d’Estudis Occitans, 1972. 
 Jules Coupier, (& Philippe Blanchet) Dictionnaire français-provençal / Diciounàri francés-prouvençau, Aix en Provence: Association Dictionnaire Français-Provençal / Edisud, 1995. (rhodanian dialect)
 Philippe Blanchet, Le provençal : essai de description sociolinguistique et différentielle, Institut de Linguistique de Louvain, Louvain, Peeters, 1992 (lire en ligne [archive]). 
 Philippe Blanchet, Dictionnaire fondamental français-provençal. (Variété côtière et intérieure), Paris, éditions Gisserot-éducation, 2002. 
 Philippe Blanchet, Découvrir le provençal, un "cas d'école" sociolinguistique [archive], cours en ligne de l'Université Ouverte des Humanités, 2020. 
 Philippe Blanchet, Langues, cultures et identités régionales en Provence. La Métaphore de l’aïoli, Paris, L'Harmattan, 2002. 
 Pierre Vouland, Du provençal rhodanien parlé à l'écrit mistralien, précis d'analyse structurale et comparée, Aix-en-Provence, Edisud, 2005, 206 pages.
 Alain Barthélemy-Vigouroux & Guy Martin, Manuel pratique de provençal contemporain, Édisud 2006,

External links

Provençal - English Dictionary - a list of words, with some mistakes
Modern Provençal phonology and morphology studied in the language of Frederic Mistral (1921)